Millettia rhodantha is a plant species as described by Henri Ernest Baillon, found in Angola. A synonym to it is Millettia aromatica.

Millettia rhodantha is included in the genus Millettia in the family Fabaceae.

No subspecies are listed in the Catalogue of Life.

References

rhodantha
Taxa named by Henri Ernest Baillon